Dylan Groenewegen (born 21 June 1993) is a Dutch professional road racing cyclist, who currently rides for UCI WorldTeam . He has won five individual Tour de France stages and one team time trial stage. He has also won the Dutch National Road Race Championships, five stages of the Tour of Norway, five stages of the Tour of Britain and three stages of Paris–Nice. In 2020, Groenewegen received considerable attention for causing a serious crash at the Tour de Pologne, which put Fabio Jakobsen in hospital, and for which Groenewegen received a nine-month ban from racing.

Early life
Groenewegen was born to a working-class family in Amsterdam. His grandfather, Ko Zieleman (1933–2021), assembled custom bike frames of which Groenewegen received his first bike at the age of seven. Zieleman owned a shop selling bike frames, a trade that his father had started in 1928, which Groenewegen's father, Gerrie, has continued. At the age of 17, Groenewegen went to a trade school in order to follow his previous three generations as a frame-builder.

Career

Pre-World Tour
He chose the former as they gave him "a lot of confidence".

LottoNL–Jumbo (2016–2021)

2016
In June, Groenewegen won the Dutch National Road Race Championships after outsprinting Wouter Wippert. During a review of Groenewegen's Bianchi Oltre XR4 bicycle, Simon Richardson of Global Cycling Network said he is "a very easy rider to work with" in respect to the mechanics. Groenewegen won stage 4 of the Tour of Britain.

2017
In the Dubai Tour, which ran from late January into early February, Groenewegen came second in the general classification, having finished second in stages 1 and 2. Despite narrowly missing out on victory in these areas, he did win the overall youth classification. On 28 April, Groenewegen won the first stage of the Tour de Yorkshire. He came fourth on the second stage which finished in Harrogate. He continued this success when in May, he won two stages at the Tour of Norway.

The Tour de France started well for Groenewegen when he came fifth on stage 2, the first flat stage. He produced two more top-10 results in the first week, with sixth in stages 6 and 7. After two mountain stages and a rest day in Dordogne, he returned to finish third on stage 10 – a  route from Périgueux to Bergerac. Groenewegen won the final stage of the race on the last stage on the Champs-Élysées in Paris.

2018
In February, Groenewegen competed in the Dubai Tour and won stage 1. Groenewegen held the general classification lead until the third stage when he was penalised 20 seconds after illegally drafting behind his team's car after suffering a mechanical fault. The blue jersey, given to the race leader, was lost to Elia Viviani who started the day two seconds behind Groenewegen, who dropped out of the top 10. He expressed his anger, saying "I had problems with my bike, the mechanicals fucked it up for me. I actually think it was a good decision by the judges but it fucked it up for me" before placing the blame on his mechanics, saying that "it's the fault of my mechanics".

In the Tour de France, Groenewegen won stage 7 after beating Fernando Gaviria and Peter Sagan, both of whom had won two stages to that point in the tour. Groenewegen also won stage 8, beating Sagan and John Degenkolb in Amiens. In an interview, Groenewegen said that the sprint was "a bit messy" but he said that he "surged ahead" and took advantage of the "good opportunity".

2019
In March, Groenewegen won the first two stages of Paris–Nice. Later in March, he won the Three Days of Bruges–De Panne, out sprinting Gaviria and Viviani after squeezing through a gap between Gaviria and the barrier in order to open up his sprint.

Team Jumbo-Visma won the team time trial on stage 2 of the Tour de France, thus increasing the lead of Groenewegen's teammate, Mike Teunissen in the general classification. Groenwegen went on to win stage 7 of the Tour de France, the longest stage in the tour at  finishing in Chalon-sur-Saône. He beat Caleb Ewan and Sagan, giving him his fourth Tour de France stage win. Groenewegen won stages 1, 3 and 5 of the Tour of Britain, beating Davide Cimolai, Mathieu van der Poel, and Matthew Walls on the respective stages.

2020
Groenewegen's 2020 season started well, with victories on stages 1 and 3 as well as the points classification of the Volta a la Comunitat Valenciana. Groenewegen had further success in the UAE Tour, winning stage 4 on 26 February. He beat Fernando Gaviria and Pascal Ackermann to the finish in Dubai after 173 km.

During stage 1 of the Tour de Pologne in Katowice, Poland on 5 August, Groenewegen pushed Fabio Jakobsen into the barriers surrounding the finish line causing a very serious crash that put his rival in hospital and eventually in a medically induced coma. Groenewegen crashed as well and suffered a broken collarbone. More riders were involved in the crash; French sprinter Marc Sarreau had to abandon the race due to his injuries resulting from the crash. Groenewegen was disqualified from the race and fined CHF 500. Jakobsen's directeur sportif Patrick Lefevere said his team are considering bringing criminal charges against Groenewegen.

In November 2020, Groenewegen was handed a nine-month ban for causing the crash, backdated to the day of the incident, meaning the ban ended on 7 May 2021. The previous month, Jakobsen had to undergo facial surgery where his jaw was reconstructed and bone was transplanted. Both Groenewegen and his team Jumbo-Visma apologized and took responsibility, with Groenewegen saying he "deviated from [his] line" and also that he wanted to be a "fair sprinter".

Team BikeExchange–Jayco (2022–present)
In December 2021, Groenewegen signed a three-year contract with Australian UCI WorldTeam  from 2022 season. Early in the season he won stages in several smaller races including the Tour de Hongrie, the Tour of Slovenia as well as the 2022 Saudi Tour where he won two stages and the points classification. In the 2022 Tour de France he won stage 3, his first victory at the Tour since 2019.

Personal life
As of 2017, Groenewegen lives in Rivierenbuurt, a district in Amsterdam.

Major results

2011
 2nd Road race, National Junior Road Championships
2012
 Vuelta Ciclista a León
1st  Points classification
1st Stage 5
 3rd Münsterland Giro
 4th Nationale Sluitingsprijs
 9th Dutch Food Valley Classic
 9th Omloop van het Houtland
2013
 1st Kernen Omloop Echt-Susteren
 1st Ronde van Noord-Holland
 2nd Ronde van Vlaanderen Beloften
 4th Dorpenomloop Rucphen
 5th Overall Olympia's Tour
 6th Nationale Sluitingsprijs
 8th Zuid Oost Drenthe Classic I
 9th Antwerpse Havenpijl
2014
 1st Ronde van Vlaanderen Beloften
 1st Stage 2 Tour de Normandie
 3rd Trofeo Palma
 3rd Zuid Oost Drenthe Classic I
 10th Ronde van Overijssel
 10th Gooikse Pijl
2015
 1st Arnhem–Veenendaal Classic
 1st Brussels Cycling Classic
 5th Handzame Classic
 7th Grote Prijs Stad Zottegem
2016
 1st  Road race, National Road Championships
 1st Rund um Köln
 1st Heistse Pijl
 1st Tour de l'Eurométropole
 1st Arnhem–Veenendaal Classic
 Tour de Yorkshire
1st  Points classification
1st Stage 1
 Ster ZLM Toer
1st  Points classification
1st Stage 3
 Tour of Britain
1st  Points classification
1st Stage 4
 1st Stage 1 Eneco Tour
 1st Stage 1 Driedaagse van West-Vlaanderen
 1st Stage 3 Volta a la Comunitat Valenciana
 2nd Handzame Classic
 3rd Ronde van Drenthe
 3rd Nokere Koerse
 4th Kuurne–Brussels–Kuurne
 6th EuroEyes Cyclassics
 6th Le Samyn
 9th Scheldeprijs
2017
 Ster ZLM Toer
1st  Points classification
1st Stages 2 & 3
 Tour of Norway
1st Stages 2 & 4
 Tour de France
 1st Stage 21
 1st Stage 5 Tour of Guangxi
 1st Stage 1 Tour de Yorkshire
 1st Stage 7 Tour of Britain
 2nd Overall Dubai Tour
1st  Young rider classification
 2nd Kampioenschap van Vlaanderen
 3rd Road race, National Road Championships
 3rd EuroEyes Cyclassics
 3rd Tacx Pro Classic
 5th Dwars door Vlaanderen
 5th Münsterland Giro
2018
 1st  Kampioenschap van Vlaanderen
 1st Kuurne–Brussels–Kuurne
 1st Arnhem–Veenendaal Classic
 Tour de France
1st Stages 7 & 8
 Tour of Norway
1st Stages 1, 3 & 4
 Volta ao Algarve
1st Stages 1 & 4
 1st Stage 2 Paris–Nice
 1st Stage 1 Tour of Guangxi
 1st Stage 1 Dubai Tour
 1st Stage 2 Tour of Slovenia
 7th Gooikse Pijl
2019
 1st Three Days of Bruges–De Panne
 1st Tacx Pro Classic
 Four Days of Dunkirk
1st Stages 1, 2 & 3
 Tour of Britain
1st Stages 1, 3 & 5
 Tour de France
1st Stages 2 (TTT) & 7
 Paris–Nice
1st Stages 1 & 2
 1st Stage 4 Volta ao Algarve
 1st Stage 5 Volta a la Comunitat Valenciana
 3rd Kampioenschap van Vlaanderen
 4th Kuurne–Brussels–Kuurne
 4th Primus Classic
 9th Overall ZLM Tour
1st  Points classification
1st Stages 1 & 2
2020
 Volta a la Comunitat Valenciana
1st  Points classification
1st Stages 1 & 3
 1st Stage 4 UAE Tour
2021
 Tour de Wallonie
1st  Points classification
1st Stages 1 & 4
 1st Stage 1 Danmark Rundt
 2nd Kampioenschap van Vlaanderen
 3rd Ronde van Drenthe
 9th Binche–Chimay–Binche
 10th Elfstedenronde
2022
 1st Veenendaal–Veenendaal Classic
 Saudi Tour
1st  Points classification
1st Stages 3 & 5
 1st Stage 3 Tour de France
 1st Stage 2 Tour of Slovenia
 1st Stage 2 Arctic Race of Norway
 1st Stage 4 Tour de Hongrie
 2nd Classic Brugge–De Panne
 2nd Grand Prix de Fourmies
 2nd Paris–Chauny
 3rd Kampioenschap van Vlaanderen
 3rd Omloop van het Houtland
 3rd Memorial Rik Van Steenbergen
 5th Gooikse Pijl
 7th Münsterland Giro
2023
 Saudi Tour
1st  Points classification
1st Stage 1
 1st Stage 5 UAE Tour
 10th Milano–Torino

Grand Tour general classification results timeline

Classics results timeline

Major championships timeline

Notes

References

External links

1993 births
Living people
Dutch male cyclists
Cyclists from Amsterdam
Tour de France Champs Elysées stage winners
Dutch Tour de France stage winners
20th-century Dutch people
21st-century Dutch people